The Abbey of Notre-Dame des Neiges or Our Lady of the Snows is a Trappist monastery in the Ardèche département of south-central France. It was built in 1850, located on the territory of the commune of Saint-Laurent-les-Bains, about one and a half miles east of the village of La Bastide-Puylaurent (Lozère).

History 
Prior to the French Revolution, there were several Cistercian monasteries in the region, namely Mazan Abbey, Les Chambons Abbey, and Mercoire Abbey. These were however destroyed and sold off during the French Revolution.

In 1791, Jean Chalbos purchased a former barn of Les Chambons. His descendants offered to return the land back to monastic use and offered it to Aiguebelle Abbey, who initially declined the offer, but eventually accepted the second time, having received encouragement from the bishops of Valence and Viviers.

The monastery was officially founded on 5 August 1850, the feast day of Our Lady of the Snows. The priory was elevated to an abbey in 1874, with the election of their first abbot, Polycarpe Marthoud. At the time, there were some 90 members of the abbey.

Robert Louis Stevenson visited in 1878 while on a hiking trip he described in Travels with a Donkey in the Cévennes.

The French Third Republic initially planned to expel the monks again in November 1880, however a sudden snowfall prevented this from being executed. With the threat of persecution, the abbot made a foundation in Akbes, Syria, so as to ensure that a refuge was available for the monks should they be expelled again.

In January 1890, Charles de Foucauld entered the monastery as a novice, and was given the religious name "Marie-Albéric". Due to his plea, after some months he was sent to the Syrian abbey of La Trappe at Akbès.

The monastery was burned down in a fire in 1912 and was rebuilt. In January 2022, the Vatican announced that Notre-Dame des Neiges has to be closed due to the lack of novices and the death of two brothers in 2021. According to the newspaper La Croix, the remaining ten brothers made the decision together on Christmas Eve 2021. The abbey will be resettled by Cistercian nuns of the abbey of St Mary's Abbey in Boulaur.

References

External links

Official website (in French)
Hiking trails:
GR 72
GR 7

Trappist monasteries in France
Religious organizations established in 1850
Buildings and structures in Ardèche
Catholic organizations established in the 19th century
19th-century Christian monasteries
1850 establishments in France
19th-century Roman Catholic church buildings in France